Benjamin Koech (born 25 June 1969) is a Kenyan athlete. He competed in the men's long jump at the 1992 Summer Olympics.

References

1969 births
Living people
Athletes (track and field) at the 1992 Summer Olympics
Kenyan male long jumpers
Kenyan male triple jumpers
Olympic athletes of Kenya
Place of birth missing (living people)
African Games medalists in athletics (track and field)
African Games bronze medalists for Kenya
Athletes (track and field) at the 1991 All-Africa Games